Maryanne Joshua George is a Grammy-award winning American Christian musician and songwriter of Malayalee origin. George is also a member of the Maverick City Music collective. George made her solo debut in 2021 with the release of her debut extended play, Not Just Stories, via Tribl Records. Not Just Stories debuted at number twelve on the Top Christian Albums Chart and number three on the Top Gospel Albums Chart in the United States.

Career
Maryanne studied music at Alliance University School of Music (formerly Nyack College) in New York. In September 2021, Tribl Records announced that Maryanne J. George will be making her solo career with the release of an extended play titled Not Just Stories, slated for October 8, 2021. Not Just Stories was released on October 8, 2021. The album debuted at number twelve on the Top Christian Albums Chart and number three on the Top Gospel Albums Chart published by Billboard in the United States having sold 3,000 equivalent album units.

Discography

EPs

Singles

As lead artist

As featured artist

Promotional singles

Other charted songs

Other appearances

Awards and nominations

Grammy Awards

!
|-
| rowspan="4" | 2022
| "Wait on You"
| Best Gospel Performance/Song
| 
| rowspan="4" | 
|-
| Jubilee: Juneteenth Edition
| Best Gospel Album
| 
|-
| "Jireh"
| Best Contemporary Christian Music Performance/Song
| 
|-
| Old Church Basement
| Best Contemporary Christian Music Album
| 
|-
| rowspan="5" | 2023
| "Kingdom"
| Best Gospel Performance/Song
| 
| rowspan="5" | 
|-
| Kingdom Book One
| Best Gospel Album
| 
|-
| "God Really Loves Us (Radio Version)"
| rowspan="2" | Best Contemporary Christian Music Performance/Song
| 
|-
| "Fear Is Not My Future"
| 
|-
| Breathe
| Best Contemporary Christian Music Album
| 
|-
|}

Notes

References

External links
 

Living people
20th-century Christians
21st-century Christians
21st-century American singers
American women singer-songwriters
American performers of Christian music
Composers of Christian music
Christian music songwriters
People from Queens, New York
21st-century American women
1992 births
Singer-songwriters from New York (state)